Christopher Lewis Landrum, Sr. (born September 14, 1992) is a former American football linebacker. He played college football at Auburn before transferring to Jacksonville State. He was signed by the San Diego Chargers as an undrafted free agent after the 2016 NFL Draft.

High school career
Landrum attended Sweet Water High School. In 2009, as a junior, he recorded 68 tackles and 12 sacks on defense and 974 rushing yards on offense. As a senior, he helped lead his team to the 2010 state championship and was named the state championship game's Most Valuable Player (MVP), a game in which he recorded seven tackles and a fumble recovery on defense and an eight-yard rushing touchdown on offense. He was named to the All-Southeast Regional team by PrepStar. He was listed as the 10th overall recruit from Alabama by SuperPrep, 13th on the Birmingham News list of the Alabama Super Senior, 17th overall on the Mobile Press-Registers Elite 18, 22nd overall at outside linebacker in the nation, and the 11th player overall in the state of Alabama by Scout.com, 48th overall outside linebacker in the nation and 19th player overall in Alabama by Rivals.com, and 105th overall outside linebacker in the nation by ESPN.com and Scouts, Inc.

College career

Auburn
Landrum originally attended Auburn University. In 2011, he redshirt as a true freshman. In 2012, he appeared in one game.

Jacksonville State
Landrum transferred to Jacksonville State University (JSU). In 2013, as a sophomore, he appeared in 15 games (11 starts). He recorded 38 tackles, 11 tackles-for-loss, four sacks, four quarterback hurries, and one pass defensed. He was named to the Ohio Valley Conference (OVC) All-Newcomer team. As a junior in 2014, he started all 12 games. He recorded 3.5 sacks and 9.5 tackles-for-loss. He was named to the Second-team All-Ohio Valley Conference team. In 2015, as a senior, he tied the school record with 19 tackles-for-loss and was named an All-American and First-tam All-Ohio Valley Conference.

He earned his degree in human resource management at Jacksonville State and began working on his Master's degree in sports management.

Professional career

After going undrafted in the 2016 NFL Draft, Landrum signed with the San Diego Chargers. He was released on September 3, 2016 and was later signed to the practice squad. On October 22, he was promoted to the Chargers active roster.

On August 22, 2017, Landrum was waived with an injury designation by the Chargers. After going unclaimed, he was placed on injured reserve.

In 2018, Landrum played in seven games before being waived on December 20, 2018.

Houston Texans
On December 24, 2018, Landrum was signed to the Houston Texans practice squad. He signed a reserve/future contract on January 7, 2019.

On August 10, 2019, Landrum was waived/injured by the Texans and placed on injured reserve. He was waived on July 14, 2020.

Personal life
Chris Landrum is the son of Roosevelt and Jaqueline Landrum. He has three brothers, Deshawn, Laderius, and Jayden, and one sister, Andrea Landrum. He is married to Bria Landrum and has a son, Christopher Landrum, Jr.

References

External links
 Jacksonville State Gamecocks bio
 Los Angeles Chargers bio

1992 births
Living people
American football defensive ends
American football linebackers
Houston Texans players
Jacksonville State Gamecocks football players
Los Angeles Chargers players
People from Marengo County, Alabama
Players of American football from Alabama
Players of American football from Mississippi
San Diego Chargers players
Sportspeople from Meridian, Mississippi